Gérard Paul Alain Feldzer (born 10 February 1944) is a consultant and aeronautical popularizer.  He is a former French airline pilot, President of Comité régional de tourisme d'Île-de-France (Regional Committee of Île-de-France Tourism) since May 2010, and Vice-Président of Ports de Paris (Ports of Paris).

He has also been Regional Advisor of Île-de-France for Europe Écologie since March 2010 and a close friend of Nicolas Hulot.

Biography 

Gérard Feldzer was born in 1944 in Aurec-sur-Loire. He started his career as an airline pilot at Air Algérie (1973–1974) and moved to Aéropostale where he did night flights from 1974-1976. At Air France, he was a pilot on Sud Aviation Caravelle, Boeing 707 and 747 aircraft, Captain (1989–1992) then Captain Instructor (1992–2004) on Airbus A310, A340 and A330.

In 1985, he applied for an Astronaut job at CNES and was one of ten finalists.

He became President of the Aéro-Club de France between 1995 and 2005.  The centenary of the club took place during his presidency, and he organized a major exhibition of planes in Paris on the Champs-Élysées to celebrate it.

Between 2005 and August 2010, Gérard Feldzer was head of the Musée de l'Air (French Air and Space Museum) at Le Bourget,.  He made many animations and creations there including "Planete Pilote" ("Planet pilot"), the first space exhibition in the world aimed at 6-12 year olds.

He co-founded Zebunet (a micro-credit organisation for poor farmers in southern countries ) in 2001 and he has been its Vice-President since then. He also founded the "Les ailes de la ville" scheme, which provides training and integration for young suburban people through repairing and constructing aircraft.
As Founder and President of the "Transports passion" association, he has organized their annual meetings, exhibitions and events on ecomobility since 2005.

On 1 January 2012, he became Officiers of the Légion d'honneur.

Media

Radio 
Feldzer has had a weekly radio show on France Info since 2009.  Recent episodes include Circulez! il y a le monde à voir (Move! there is the world to see)).

TV series 
Feldzer wrote and directed the following series:

 Le Bar de l'escadrille (France 2, 1985)
 Un ticket pour l'espace (France 2, 1990)
 Les allumés du sport (Canal+ 1992)

and co-wrote the transport series Transportez-moi in 2011, which aired on LCP TV in 2012.

Books 
 Demain, je serai pilote.

Bibliography 

 Demain je serai pilote, Gallimard, 1999
 Académie nationale de l'air et de l'espace and Lucien Robineau, Les Français du ciel, dictionnaire historique, Le Cherche midi, June 2005, 782 p., p. 212, FELDZER, Gérard

References 

1944 births
Space program of France
Living people
École nationale de l'aviation civile alumni
Aviation in France
French aviators
Officiers of the Légion d'honneur
Officers of the Ordre national du Mérite
French aerospace engineers
Commercial aviators